The Supreme Commander–in–Chief (Supreme Commander) is the supreme commander of the armed forces of a state (or coalition of states), usually in wartime and sometimes in peacetime.

The Supreme Commander–in–Chief is also vested with extraordinary power in relation to all civilian institutions and persons on the territory of a given state and the theater of military operations (theater of war). As a rule, the head of state is the Supreme Commander–in–Chief. For the first time, the corresponding English term was used by the king of England, Scotland and Ireland, Charles I (1625–1649). In some states of the British Commonwealth, this position is replaced by the Governor–General.

Supreme Commanders–in–Chief in the history of Russia

The All–Russian Emperor, according to Article 14 of the Basic Laws of the Russian Empire, was the "sovereign leader" of the Russian Armed Forces, he possessed the supreme command over all land and naval armed forces of the Russian state and the exclusive right to issue decrees and orders "to everything generally related to the organization of the armed forces and defense of the Russian State", as well as the establishment of restrictions on the right of residence and the acquisition of real estate in the localities that make up the fortress areas and strongholds for the army and navy. The emperor declared areas of martial law or exceptional status (Article 15).

At the same time, the legislation of the Russian Empire allowed the existence of this position as separate from the position of the head of state. Thus, the provision on field command and control of troops in wartime provided that "The supreme command over all land and naval forces intended for military operations shall be entrusted to the Supreme Commander–in–Chief, if the sovereign does not deign to lead the troops personally" (Article 6), such was appointed "by direct the election of the sovereign "(that is, independently by the Emperor, and not by anyone's recommendation) by the highest order and decree of the Senate. The Supreme Commander–in–Chief was defined as "the supreme commander of all land and naval armed forces intended for military action" (Article 17), was responsible only to the Emperor and was subordinate only to him (Article 20). In the theater of operations, his orders had the same force as the Imperial commands (Article 17). The Commander–in–Chief of the Russian Armed Forces could, "if military circumstances have it", conclude and terminate an armistice with the enemy, immediately informing the Emperor about it, but if the armistice or its termination does not seem "urgently necessary", then he should have obtained the Emperor's consent before his conclusion and termination (Article 25), but he could not enter into peace negotiations without a special order from the Emperor (Article 26).

For the first time in Russian history, this position was replaced on July 20, 1914. Grand Duke Nikolai Nikolaevich Junior was appointed to it.

During the First World War
During the First World War, this position was held by:
Adjutant General, General of the Cavalry, Grand Duke Nikolai Nikolaevich (July 20, 1914 – August 23, 1915);
Emperor Nicholas II (August 23, 1915 – March 2, 1917);
On March 2, 1917, Nicholas II, before his abdication, appointed Grand Duke Nikolai Nikolaevich as Supreme Commander–in–Chief. The Grand Duke arrived at the Headquarters in Mogilev, but after a meeting with Mikhail Alekseev, who was appointed Commander–in–Chief by the decree of the Provisional Government, he was forced to "give up" this post.
Adjutant General, General of the Cavalry, Grand Duke Nikolai Nikolaevich ( March 2–9, 1917);
Infantry General Mikhail Alekseev (March 11, 1917 – May 21, 1917);
Cavalry General Alexei Brusilov (May 22, 1917 – July 19, 1917);
Infantry General Lavr Kornilov (July 19, 1917 – August 27, 1917);
After the removal of Kornilov from the post of Supreme Commander–in–Chief, Kerensky offered this position to Lieutenant general Alexander Lukomsky and Infantry General Vladislav Klembovsky, but both of these military leaders refused Kerensky's offer.
Minister–Chairman of the Provisional Government Alexander Kerensky (August 30, 1917 – November 3, 1917);
Lieutenant general Nikolay Dukhonin (November 3, 1917 – November 20, 1917) (acting);
Ensign Nikolai Krylenko (November 20, 1917 – March 5, 1918).
In connection with the reorganization of the management of the army and navy, after the signing of the Brest Peace Treaty by the Bolsheviks, the post of the Supreme Commander–in–Chief was abolished.

In accordance with the governing documents of that period, the Supreme Commander–in–Chief controlled only the active army and navy.

During the Civil War

Supreme Commanders–in–Chief of the Armed Forces of Soviet Russia
Joachim Vatsetis (September 1, 1918 – July 9, 1919);
Sergey Kamenev (July 9, 1919 – April 28, 1924). From August 28, 1923 – Commander–in–Chief of the Armed Forces of the Soviet Union.
In connection with the transition from collegial management of the army to a centralized one, the post of the Commander–in–Chief was eliminated.

Supreme Commanders–in–Chief of the Armed Forces of the Russian State
Lieutenant general Vasily Boldyrev (September 24, 1918 – November 18, 1918).
Admiral Alexander Kolchak (November 18, 1918 – January 4, 1920).
After the arrest and execution of Kolchak, the Supreme Command formally passed to Anton Denikin.

Soviet Union

In the Soviet Union on August 8, 1941, during the Great Patriotic War, Joseph Stalin was appointed the Supreme Commander–in–Chief of the Armed Forces of the Soviet Union. Joseph Stalin continued to hold this position in peacetime.

In 1955–1990, the Chairman of the Defense Council of the Soviet Union was unofficially called the Supreme Commander–in–Chief. The officeholders were always the General Secretary of the Communist Party of the Soviet Union.

By the Law of the Soviet Union, dated March 14, 1990, No. 1360–I, Chapter 15.1 "President of the Soviet Union" was introduced into the Constitution of the Soviet Union and, in accordance with it, the President of the Soviet Union was the Supreme Commander–in–Chief of the Armed Forces of the Soviet Union.

On March 15, 1990, Mikhail Gorbachev was elected first President of the Soviet Union, who became the Supreme Commander–in–Chief for the highest office in the Union.

On December 25, 1991, the President of the Soviet Union (before resigning) issued Presidential Decree No. 3162 "On the Resignation by the President of the Soviet Union of the Powers of the Supreme Commander–in–Chief of the Armed Forces of the Soviet Union and the Abolition of the Defense Council Under the President of the Soviet Union", which stated "In connection with the resignation I resign from the post of President of the Soviet Union the powers of the Supreme Commander–in–Chief of the Armed Forces of the Soviet Union".

Russia

In Russia, in accordance with Article 87 of the Constitution of the Russian Federation, the President of the Russian Federation is the Supreme Commander–in–Chief of the Armed Forces of the Russian Federation.

On May 7, 1992, the President of the Russian Federation Boris Yeltsin issued Decree No. 467 "On Assuming the Office of the Supreme Commander–in–Chief of the Armed Forces of the Russian Federation". The powers of the President as the Supreme Commander–in–Chief are enshrined in the Law of the Russian Federation No. 4061–I "On Amendments and Additions to the Constitution (Basic Law) of the Russian Federation – Russia" dated December 9, 1992, which entered into force from the moment of publication in the "Rossiyskaya Gazeta" on January 12, 1993. On December 25, 1993, the Constitution of the Russian Federation came into force, which confirmed the status of the Supreme Commander–in–Chief for the President of the Russian Federation.
Boris Yeltsin (May 7, 1992 – December 31, 1999);
Viktor Chernomyrdin (November 5, 1996 – November 6, 1996);
Vladimir Putin (December 31, 1999 – May 7, 2008, and from May 7, 2012);
Dmitry Medvedev (May 7, 2008 – May 7, 2012).

Saudi Arabia
The king is the supreme and absolute commander of all military forces in Saudi Arabia

Azerbaijan 
The Supreme Commander-in-Chief of the Azerbaijani Forces is the President of Azerbaijan.

India
The Supreme Commander of the Indian Armed Forces is the President of India.

Iran
In accordance with Article 110 of the Constitution of Iran, the Supreme Commander of the Armed Forces of the Country is the Supreme Leader of Iran (Rahbar), who has practically unlimited powers in all military and military–political issues.

He has the power to declare war, peace and general mobilization. He carries out the appointment, removal and acceptance of the resignation of the highest military leaders.

The Supreme Council of National Security is subordinate to him.

Kazakhstan
The Supreme Commander–in–Chief of the Armed Forces of the Republic of Kazakhstan is the President of Kazakhstan, who carries out general management of the construction, preparation and use of the military organization, ensuring the military security of the state.

South Korea
The Supreme Commander of the South Korean Armed Forces is the President of South Korea.

North Korea
The Supreme Commander of the Korean People's Army is the Chairman of the Central Military Commission of the Workers' Party of Korea.

Poland
The post of the Supreme Commander–in–Chief of the Polish Army – the highest in the Polish Army – is held by the President of Poland, in accordance with Article 134 and Chapter 4 (of April 2, 1997). Since 1917, he was appointed only during the war on the proposal of the Presidium of the Council of Ministers.

Tajikistan
The President of the Republic of Tajikistan is the Supreme Commander–in–Chief of the Armed Forces of Tajikistan.

Turkmenistan
According to Article 53 of the Constitution of Turkmenistan, the President of Turkmenistan is the Supreme Commander–in–Chief of the Armed Forces of Turkmenistan, gives orders on general or partial mobilization, use of the Armed Forces, changing their locations, bringing them into combat condition, appoints the high command of the Armed Forces, and manages the activities of the State Security Council of Turkmenistan.

Ukraine
In accordance with Article 106 of the Constitution of Ukraine, the President of Ukraine is the Supreme Commander–in–Chief of the Armed Forces of Ukraine; appoints and dismisses the high command of the Armed Forces of Ukraine and other military formations; carries out leadership in the spheres of national security and state defense.

See also
Commander
Commander–in–Chief

References

External links
Armed Forces and Ground Forces of Iran

Command and control